Sir Richard Radford Best,  (28 July 1933 – 7 March 2014) was a senior British diplomat. He served as Ambassador to Iceland from 1989 to 1991.

Early life
Best was born in Worthing, West Sussex, on 28 July 1933. He studied history at University College London, graduating Bachelor of Arts (BA).

Career
On 31 December 1970, Best was appointed an officer of the Her Majesty's Diplomatic Service.

Honours
In the 1977 Queen's Birthday Honours, Best was appointed Member of the Order of the British Empire (MBE) for his services as First Secretary, H.M. Embassy Stockholm. and a CBE in the 1989 New Year Honours for his service as Deputy High Commissioner in Nigeria. On 26 June 1990, he was appointed Knight Commander of the Royal Victorian Order (KCVO), therefore granted the title of Sir.

References

External links
Interview with Sir Richard Radford Best & transcript, British Diplomatic Oral History Programme, Churchill College, Cambridge, 1996

1933 births
2014 deaths
Ambassadors of the United Kingdom to Iceland
Knights Commander of the Royal Victorian Order
Alumni of University College London
Commanders of the Order of the British Empire
People from Worthing